James Joyce (July 2, 1870 – March 25, 1931) was an American attorney, educator, and politician who served as a member of the United States House of Representatives from Ohio's 15th congressional district for one term from 1909 to 1911.

Early life and education 
Born in Cumberland, Ohio, Joyce attended public schools. He taught school in Cumberland and Pleasant City, Ohio, and also studied law.
He entered the Cincinnati Law School in 1891 and was graduated in 1892.
He was admitted to the bar at Columbus, Ohio, on March 3, 1892.

Career 
He served as the superintendent of the Senecaville (Ohio) High School 1893–1895. He began the active practice of law in Cambridge, Ohio, in 1895.
He served as member of the Ohio House of Representatives 1896–1900. He served as delegate to the 1904 Republican National Convention.

Joyce was elected as a Republican to the Sixty-first Congress (March 4, 1909 – March 3, 1911).
He was an unsuccessful candidate for reelection in 1910 to the Sixty-second Congress.
He resumed the practice of law in Cambridge, Ohio.
He was an unsuccessful candidate for election as associate justice of the Ohio Supreme Court in 1916.

Death 
Joyce died in Cambridge, Ohio, March 25, 1931.
He was interred in the mausoleum in Northwood Cemetery.

Sources

1870 births
1931 deaths
People from Cambridge, Ohio
University of Cincinnati College of Law alumni
Republican Party members of the Ohio House of Representatives
Republican Party members of the United States House of Representatives from Ohio